Sérihio (also known as Sérihi and Séryo) is a town in south-central Ivory Coast. It is a sub-prefecture of Gagnoa Department in Gôh Region, Gôh-Djiboua District.

Sérihio was a commune until March 2012, when it became one of 1126 communes nationwide that were abolished.

In 2014, the population of the sub-prefecture of Sérihio was 42,545.

Villages
 Valoua  (4 091)
 Wanéwa  (5 428)
 Gnatroa  (21 879)
 Inagbéhio  (1 383)
 Sérihio  (6 926)
 Valoua  (4 091)
 Wanéwa  (5 428)

References

Sub-prefectures of Gôh
Former communes of Ivory Coast